Irishad Ahmad is professor and head of the Department of Civil Engineering at the American University of Sharjah in the United Arab Emirates. He was formerly professor and the Director of the Florida International University Moss School of Construction in Miami, Florida, and the former editor in chief of the Journal of Management in Engineering (ASCE)

He received the 2016 W.A. Klinger Construction Education Award from the American Institute of Constructors.

Books
Tang, S.L. I. Ahmad, S.M. Ahmed and M. Lu, “Quantitative Techniques for Decision Making in Construction.” Hong Kong Polytechnic University Press. 2004.

Edited Proceedings
Ahmad, I., S.M. Ahmed, and S. Azhar, Proceedings of the First International Conference on Construction in the Twenty First Century, held in Miami, April, 2002.
Ahmed, S.M., I. Ahmad, S.L. Tang, and S. Azhar, Proceedings of the Second International Conference on Construction in the Twenty First Century, held in Hong Kong, December, 2003.

References

Year of birth missing (living people)
Living people
Florida International University faculty
People from Miami
Academic staff of the American University of Sharjah